The William Blackwell House, at 138 Lebanon Hill in Springfield, Kentucky, was built in c.1860 by William Blackwell.  It was listed on the National Register of Historic Places in 1989.

It is a seven-bay single-story frame house with a recessed front porch.  It has pilasters and an architrave.  Its interior has Greek Revival mantels.

References

Houses on the National Register of Historic Places in Kentucky
Greek Revival houses in Kentucky
Houses completed in 1860
Houses in Washington County, Kentucky
National Register of Historic Places in Washington County, Kentucky
1860 establishments in Kentucky
Buildings and structures in Springfield, Kentucky